Charles Thomas Baring (11 January 1807 – 14 September 1879) was an English bishop, noted as an Evangelical.

Early life, family and education
Baring was born into the Baring banking family on 11 January 1807, the fourth son of Sir Thomas Baring, 2nd Baronet, and Mary née Sealy. Having been educated privately as a child, he read classics and mathematics at Christ Church, Oxford, before ordination, and was President of the Oxford Union. He first married Mary Sealy (who died in 1840) in 1830; they had at least one child – Tory politician Thomas Charles Baring was their son. He later remarried in 1846, his cousin Caroline Kemp, with whom he had further children – their son Francis became a priest. Caroline survived Charles.

Career
Ordained a deacon on 6 June 1830 and a priest on 29 May 1831 by Richard Bagot, Bishop of Oxford, Baring began his ecclesiastical career at St Ebbe's, Oxford and Kings Worthy before taking the benefice of All Souls', Marylebone, in 1847. He moved to Limpsfield in 1855, but was soon elected Bishop of Gloucester and Bristol. He became a bishop at a period when Lord Palmerston, influenced by Anthony Ashley-Cooper, 7th Earl of Shaftesbury, was promoting Evangelicals.

He translated to the see of Durham in 1861, where as Bishop of Durham he came into conflict with High Church clergy, for example suspending Francis Grey, rector of Morpeth, as Rural Dean, for wearing a stole of which he disapproved. He resigned due to ill health on 2 February 1879 and died in Wimbledon on 14 September, and was interred at Holy Innocents Church at High Beach, Essex.

Styles and titles
6 June 1830 – 1856: The Reverend Charles Baring
1856 – 14 September 1879: The Right Reverend Charles Baring

References

Sources
Mandell Creighton, ‘Baring, Charles Thomas (1807–1879)’, rev. H. C. G. Matthew, Oxford Dictionary of National Biography, Oxford University Press, 2004

External links

Picture History – Charles Baring (1807-1879)

1807 births
1879 deaths
19th-century Church of England bishops
Charles Thomas
Bishops of Durham
Bishops of Gloucester and Bristol
Presidents of the Oxford Union
Younger sons of baronets